Tillman is an unincorporated community in Jefferson Township, Allen County, in the U.S. state of Indiana.

History
Tillman was established in 1898.

Geography

References

Unincorporated communities in Allen County, Indiana
Unincorporated communities in Indiana
Fort Wayne, IN Metropolitan Statistical Area